The 1995 Birmingham Barracudas season was the first and only season in their franchise history. The Barracudas finished 3rd in the south with a 10–8–0 record. The Barracudas signed high profile free agent Matt Dunigan as a free agent in 1995, and he set career bests with 362 completions on 643 attempts for 4,911 yards and 34 touchdown passes in only 14 games. They lost in the South Division Semi-Final to the San Antonio Texans.

Preseason

Regular season

Season standings

Season schedule

Player stats

Passing

Receiving

Rushing

Kicking
Note: FGA = Field goals attempted; FGM = Field goals made; FG% = Field goal percentage; XPA = Extra points attempted; XPM = Extra points made; XP% = Extra points percentage

Kickoff returns

Playoffs

South Semi-Final

Awards and honors

CFL All-Stars
Anthony Drawhorn, Defensive back
Matt Dunigan, Quarterback

CFL Southern All-Stars
Fred Childress, Offensive guard
Anthony Drawhorn, Defensive back
Matt Dunigan, Quarterback
Marcus Grant, Wide receiver 
Jason Phillips, Slotback 
Andre Strode, Defensive back

References

Birmingham Barracudas
Birmingham Barracudas Season, 1995